The term business risks refers to the possibility of a commercial business making inadequate profits (or even losses) due to uncertainties - for example: changes in tastes, changing preferences of consumers, strikes, increased competition, changes in government policy, obsolescence etc. Every business organization faces various risk elements while doing business. Business risk implies uncertainty in profits or danger of loss and the events that could pose a risk due to some unforeseen events in future, which causes business to fail.

For example, a company may face different risks in production, risks due to irregular supply of raw materials, machinery breakdown, labor unrest, etc. In marketing, risks may arise due to fluctuations in market prices, changing trends and fashions, errors in sales forecasting, etc. In addition, there may be loss of assets of the firm due to fire, flood, earthquakes, riots or war and political unrest which may cause unwanted interruptions in the business operations. Thus business risks may take place in different forms depending upon the nature of a company and its production.

Business risks can arise due to the influence by two major risks: internal risks (risks arising from the events taking place within the organization) and  external risks (risks arising from the events taking place outside the organization):

 Internal risks arise from factors (endogenous variables, which can be influenced) such as:
 human factors (talent management, strikes)
 technological factors (emerging technologies)
 physical factors (failure of machines, fire or theft)
 operational factors (access to credit, cost cutting, advertisement)
 External risks arise from factors (exogenous variables, which cannot be controlled) such as:
 economic factors (market risks, pricing pressure)
 natural factors (floods, earthquakes)
 political factors (compliance demands and regulations imposed by governments)

Though corporate entities may have an image of risk aversion, they may continue to stake their reputations and indulge in their gambling propensities by sponsoring competitive sports teams.

Many business risks can be related to one another. With the introduction to the Coronavirus in 2019, many businesses fell victim to a lot of risks as a result of the damage to the market. A lot of internal risks arose including the much needed transition to online communication, via Zoom etc., within a business.

A specific example of external risks can be highlighted by the change in the stock market in early 2020. Between late February to late March, out of the 22 stock market trading days, there were 18 drastic stock market jumps. Stock market jumps can ultimately cause stocks to have lower stability and higher volatility. The uncertainty of whether or not a stock is secure indicates a risk of any certain business.

Classification 
The business risk is classified into five different main types

 Strategic risk: They are the risks associated with the operations of that particular industry. These kind of risks arise from:
 Business environment: Buyers and sellers interacting to buy and sell goods and services, changes in supply and demand, competitive structures and introduction of new technologies.
 Transaction: Assets relocation of mergers and acquisitions, spin-offs, alliances and joint ventures.
 Investor relations: Strategy for communicating with individuals who have invested in the business.
 Financial Risk: These are the risks associated with the financial structure and transactions of the particular industry.
 Operational risk: These are the risks associated with the operational and administrative procedures of the particular industry.
 Compliance risk (legal risk): These are risks associated with the need to comply with the rules and regulations of the government.
 Other risks: There would be different risks like natural disaster (floods) and others depend upon the nature and scale of the industry.

References

Risk management in business